Gero may refer to:

People
Gero (singer), Japanese singer
Gero I (ca. 900–965), medieval margrave of the Holy Roman Empire
Gero, Count of Alsleben (d. 979)
Gero II (ca. 975–1015), medieval margrave of the Holy Roman Empire
Gero, Archbishop of Cologne (900–976) 
Gero, Archbishop of Magdeburg (died 1023) 
Gero Miesenböck, a Waynflete Professor of Physiology at the University of Oxford and a fellow of Magdalen College.
Gero Hütter, German hematologist
Ernő Gerő (1898–1980), Hungarian politician
Joan Gero (26 May 1944 – 14 July 2016), an American archaeologist and pioneer of feminist archaeology
Martin Gero (born 1977), a Canadian screenwriter, producer, and director

Fictional characters
Doctor Gero, a character in the Dragon Ball media

Other uses
Eastern Region Army Group (GERO) in Spain
Gero, Gifu, a city in Japan
The Gerogerigegege, a Japanese music project
Gero (book) ("Later"), a 1643 Basque-language book by Pedro Agerre.
 Dr. Gero Cup, a football tournament

See also
 Garo (disambiguation)
 Giro (disambiguation)
 Gyro (disambiguation)
 Jero
 Jiro